Saencherng Pinsinchai is a Thai former Muay Thai fighter. He was a five weight Lumpinee and Rajadamnern Stadium champion during the 1980s.

Biography & career
Saencherng was born in 1967 in the Buriram province, he started training in Muay Thai along his brothers. He fought from a young age in the northeastern regions of Thailand. In 1981 he was scouted by the Pinsinchai camp and went to live in Bangkok where he earned his ring name.

Saencherng was one of the most dominant fighter of his time winning stadium titles at five different weights between 1983 and 1989. He faced and beat some of the most notable fighters of his era such as  Paruhatlek Sitchunthong, Chamuekpet Hapalang, Chanchai Sor Tamarangsri Samransak Muangsurin, Manasak Sor Ploenchit and Jaroenthong Kiatbanchong. His best purses went as high as 250,000 baht.

After his retirement Saencherng became a trainer, he teaches at his old gym Pinsinchai in Bangkok.

Titles & honours
Lumpinee Stadium
 1983 Lumpinee Stadium 105 lbs Champion
 1984 Lumpinee Stadium 112 lbs Champion
 1986 Lumpinee Stadium 122 lbs Champion
 1988 Lumpinee Stadium 130 lbs Champion
Rajadamnern Stadium
 1984 Rajadamnern Stadium 118 lbs Champion

Fight record

|-  style="background:#fbb;"
| 1989-10-06 || Loss||align=left| Cherry Sor Wanich|| Lumpinee Stadium  || Bangkok, Thailand || Decision|| 5 || 3:00 
|-
! style=background:white colspan=9 |

|-  style="background:#cfc;"
| 1989-08-29 || Win||align=left| Jaroenthong Kiatbanchong || Lumpinee Stadium|| Bangkok, Thailand || Decision || 5 || 3:00

|-  style="background:#fbb;"
| 1989-07-25 || Loss ||align=left| Cherry Sor Wanich|| Lumpinee Stadium  || Bangkok, Thailand || Decision|| 5 || 3:00 
|-
! style=background:white colspan=9 |

|-  style="background:#cfc;"
| 1989-05-02 || Win ||align=left| Manasak Sor Ploenchit || Lumpinee Stadium || Bangkok, Thailand || Decision || 5 || 3:00

|-  style="background:#cfc;"
| 1988-05-03|| Win ||align=left| Prasert Kittikasem || Lumpinee Stadium || Bangkok, Thailand || Decision || 5 || 3:00
|-
! style=background:white colspan=9 |

|-  style="background:#fbb;"
| 1988-01-26|| Loss ||align=left| Chanchai Sor Tamarangsri || Lumpinee Stadium || Bangkok, Thailand || Decision || 5 || 3:00
|-
! style=background:white colspan=9 |

|-  style="background:#c5d2ea;"
| 1987-11-27||Draw ||align=left| Chanchai Sor Tamarangsri || Lumpinee Stadium || Bangkok, Thailand || Decision || 5 || 3:00

|-  style="background:#fbb;"
| 1987-06-19 || Loss ||align=left| Manasak Sor Ploenchit || Lumpinee Stadium|| Bangkok, Thailand || TKO (Punches)  || 2 ||

|-  style="background:#cfc;"
| 1987-03-31|| Win ||align=left| Chamuekpet Hapalang || Lumpinee Stadium || Bangkok, Thailand || Decision || 5 || 3:00

|-  style="background:#cfc;"
| 1986-12-19|| Win ||align=left| Samransak Muangsurin || Huamark Stadium || Bangkok, Thailand || Decision || 5 || 3:00  
|-
! style=background:white colspan=9 |

|-  style="background:#cfc;"
| 1986-09-09 || Win ||align=left| Chanchai Sor Tamarangsri || Lumpinee Stadium || Bangkok, Thailand || Decision || 5 || 3:00

|- style="text-align:center; background:#fbb;"
|1986-04-23
|Loss
| align="left" | Jampatong Na Nontachai
|Rajadamnern Stadium
|Bangkok, Thailand
|KO (left high kick)
|2
|
|-  style="background:#cfc;"
| 1986-03-12|| Win||align=left| Jongrak Lukprabat || Rajadamnern Stadium || Bangkok, Thailand || Decision || 5 || 3:00

|-  style="background:#fbb;"
| 1985-12-26|| Loss ||align=left| Sangtiennoi Sor.Rungroj || Rajadamnern Stadium || Bangkok, Thailand || Decision || 5 || 3:00

|- style="background:#fbb;"
|1985-07-17
|Loss
| align="left" | Manasak Sor Ploenchit
|Rajadamnern Stadium
|Bangkok, Thailand
|Decision
|5
|3:00

|-  style="background:#fbb;"
| 1985-03-06 || Loss ||align=left| Samransak Muangsurin||  || Bangkok, Thailand || KO || 3 ||

|-  style="background:#cfc;"
| 1984-12-26|| Win ||align=left| Nikhom Phetphothong || Rajadamnern Stadium || Bangkok, Thailand || Decision || 5 || 3:00
|-
! style=background:white colspan=9 |

|-  style="background:#cfc;"
| 1984-09-06|| Win ||align=left| Bangkhlanoi Sor.Thanikul || Rajadamnern Stadium || Bangkok, Thailand || Decision || 5 || 3:00

|-  style="background:#cfc;"
| 1984-07-10|| Win ||align=left| Chamuekpet Hapalang || Lumpinee Stadium || Bangkok, Thailand || Decision || 5 || 3:00

|-  style="background:#cfc;"
| 1984-|| Win ||align=left| Phayannoi Sor Tassanee || Lumpinee Stadium || Bangkok, Thailand || Decision || 5 || 3:00

|-  style="background:#cfc;"
| 1984-04-20|| Win ||align=left| Klaipatapi Majestic || Lumpinee Stadium || Bangkok, Thailand || KO || 4 ||
|-
! style=background:white colspan=9 |

|-  style="text-align:center; background:#cfc;"
| 1983-12-26 || Win ||align=left| Paruhatlek Sitchunthong ||Lumpinee Stadium || Bangkok, Thailand || Decision|| 5 ||3:00

|-  style="text-align:center; background:#cfc;"
| 1983-11- || Win ||align=left| Pongdet Chomputhong ||Lumpinee Stadium || Bangkok, Thailand || Decision|| 5 ||3:00 
|-
! style=background:white colspan=9 |

|-  style="text-align:center; background:#cfc;"
| 1983-10- || Win ||align=left| Chakphetnoi Sitsei ||Lumpinee Stadium || Bangkok, Thailand || Decision|| 5 ||3:00

|-  style="text-align:center; background:#cfc;"
| 1983-09-13 || Win ||align=left| Supernoi Sitchokchai ||Lumpinee Stadium || Bangkok, Thailand || Decision|| 5 ||3:00

|-  style="text-align:center; background:#cfc;"
| 1983-|| Win ||align=left| Kaopong Sitmorbon ||Lumpinee Stadium || Bangkok, Thailand || Decision|| 5 ||3:00

|-  style="text-align:center; background:#cfc;"
| 1983-|| Win ||align=left| Sanit Wichitkriangkrai ||Lumpinee Stadium || Bangkok, Thailand || Decision|| 5 ||3:00

|-  style="text-align:center; background:#cfc;"
| 1983- || Win ||align=left| Saenthanongnoi Phettaveechai ||Lumpinee Stadium || Bangkok, Thailand || Decision|| 5 ||3:00

|-  style="text-align:center; background:#cfc;"
| 1983- || Win ||align=left| Sittichok Monsongkram ||Lumpinee Stadium || Bangkok, Thailand || Decision|| 5 ||3:00

|-  style="text-align:center; background:#cfc;"
| 1983-01-10 || Win ||align=left| Chainiyom Sitsaart ||Rajadamnern Stadium || Bangkok, Thailand || Decision|| 5 ||3:00

|-  style="text-align:center; background:#cfc;"
| 1982- || Win ||align=left| Kumanthong Kaewtai ||Lumpinee Stadium || Bangkok, Thailand || Decision|| 5 ||3:00

|-  style="text-align:center; background:#cfc;"
| 1982- || Win ||align=left| Warunee Sor.Ploenchit ||Lumpinee Stadium || Bangkok, Thailand || Decision|| 5 ||3:00

|-  style="text-align:center; background:#cfc;"
|  || Win ||align=left| Sitthi Phetmuangloi ||Lumpinee Stadium || Bangkok, Thailand || Decision|| 5 ||3:00 
|-
! style=background:white colspan=9 |

|-
| colspan=9 | Legend:

References

1967 births
Living people
Saencherng Pinsinchai
Saencherng Pinsinchai